Mike Henry may refer to:
Mike Henry (American football) (1936–2021), American football player and actor
Mike Henry (voice actor) (born 1965)
Mike Henry (politician) (born 1935), Jamaican politician
Mike Henry (businessman), Canadian businessman

See also
Michael Henry (disambiguation)